Ranko Matasović (born 14 May 1968) is a Croatian linguist, Indo-Europeanist and Celticist.

Biography 
Matasović was born and raised in Zagreb, where he attended primary and secondary school. In the Faculty of philosophy at the University of Zagreb he graduated in linguistics and philosophy, receiving an M.A. in linguistics in 1992 and a Ph.D. in 1995 under the supervision of Radoslav Katičić with the thesis A Theory of Textual Reconstruction in Indo-European Linguistics. He has received research fellowships at the University of Vienna (1993) and the University of Oxford (1995), a post-doctoral Fulbright Fellowship at the University of Wisconsin during 1997/1998 (with Andrew Sihler as an advisor), and also an Alexander von Humboldt Foundation fellowship at the University of Bonn in 2002/2003.

He currently holds a chair in the Department of Linguistics in the Faculty of Philosophy in Zagreb, where he teaches courses on comparative Indo-European grammar, Celtic studies, and language typology. His research interests include comparative Indo-European grammar (especially of Celtic and Balto-Slavic languages), language typology and syntax, and Latin, Celtic, and Hittite philology. He has contributed to the Indo-European Etymological Dictionary project organized by Leiden University with his Etymological Dictionary of Proto-Celtic. He has also published works on Armenian and Albanian, including the Arbanasi speech of the Albanian diaspora near Zadar.

In 2002 he received an award from the Croatian Academy of Sciences and Arts for a lasting contribution to philology. In 2006 he became an associate member of the same institution and was promoted into a full member in 2012.

Works

Linguistics
 A Theory of Textual Reconstruction in Indo-European Linguistics (Frankfurt a/M & New York: Peter Lang, 1996) 
 Kratka poredbenopovijesna gramatika latinskoga jezika (Zagreb: Matica hrvatska, ¹1997, ²2010) , 
 Kultura i književnost Hetita (Zagreb; Matica hrvatska, 2000)  
 Uvod u poredbenu lingvistiku (Zagreb: Matica hrvatska, 2001) 
 Gender in Indo-European (Heidelberg: Carl Winter, 2004) 
 Jezična raznolikost svijeta (Zagreb: Algoritam, ¹2005, ²2011) , 
 Poredbenopovijesna gramatika hrvatskoga jezika (Zagreb: Matica hrvatska, 2008.) 
 Etymological Dictionary of Proto-Celtic (Leiden & Boston: Brill, 2009) 
 “Addenda et corrigenda to Ranko Matasović’s Etymological Dictionary of Proto-Celtic (Brill, Leiden 2009)” (Zagreb, 2011)
 A Reader in Comparative Indo-European Religion (Zagreb: University of Zagreb, 2010)
 Etimološki rječnik hrvatskoga jezika: 1. svezak (A-Nj), 2. svezak (O-Ž), co-authored with Tijmen Pronk, Dubravka Ivšić, Dunja Brozović Rončević (Zagreb: Institut za hrvatski jezik i jezikoslovlje, 2016-2021) , 
 Slavic Nominal Word-Formation: Proto-Indo-European Origins and Historical Development (Heidelberg: Carl Winter, 2014) 
 Lingvistička povijest Europe (Zagreb: Matica hrvatska, 2016) 
 An Areal Typology of Agreement Systems (Cambridge: Cambridge University Press, 2018)

Translations
 Harfa sa sjevera. Iz irske književnosti (Zagreb: Antibarbarus, 1995) 
 Kamen kraljeva. Srednjovjekovne irske sage (Zagreb: Ex Libris, 2004) 
 Narti: Mitovi i legende s Kavkaza (Zagreb: Matica hrvatska, 2010) 
 Edward Sapir. Jezik: Uvod u istraživanje govora (Zagreb: Institut za hrvatski jezik i jezikoslovlje) 
 Ksenofont. O konjaničkom umijeću; O zapovjedniku konjice, with Maja Rupnik-Matasović (Zagreb: Latina et Graeca, 2018) 
 Plaut. Stiho (Zagreb: Latina et Graeca, 2022), with Maja Rupnik-Matasović

Fiction
 Neprobuđeni. Roman (Zagreb: Ibis grafika, 2022) 

He has published more than 100 papers in Croatian and foreign-language journals and translated various works from Latin, Ancient Greek, Lithuanian, Hittite, Old and modern Irish, Welsh, and English.

References

External links
 Personal web page of Ranko Matasović
  A Conversation with R. Matasović, Vijenac, November 6, 2008

Linguists from Croatia
Slavists
Scientists from Zagreb
Faculty of Humanities and Social Sciences, University of Zagreb alumni
Members of the Croatian Academy of Sciences and Arts
Academic staff of the University of Zagreb
1968 births
Living people
Etymologists
Indo-Europeanists
Linguists of Indo-European languages